The men's beach volleyball event at the 2004 Summer Olympics in Athens, Greece, was held at the Olympic Beach Volleyball Centre located at the Faliro Coastal Zone Olympic Complex.

Medalists

Pool play
The 24 competing teams were split equally into six pools of four, and each team played each of the other teams in their pool a best of three set match (so that the number of pool matches, P, played by each team was 3).

The teams in each pool were ranked first through fourth based on the number of matches won, W. In the event of a two-way tie, the winning team in the head-to-head match finished ahead. In a three-team tie, the total number of points each team won and lost during  all matches involving only the three tied teams were added up, and the bottom-ranked team of the three was decided by the points for to points against ratio; the other two teams were then ranked according to the outcome of the head-to-head match. The top two teams from each pool and the four best third placed teams (based on: first, matches won; second (in the event of a tie), set ratio SF/SA; and third (if there is still a tie), points ratio PF/PA) progressed through to the round of sixteen (single elimination tournament).

Two points (Pts) were awarded for each match win (W) and one point was given for each loss (L).
In individual matches, all winners are shown in bold.
In group tables advancing teams are highlighted.

Pool A

August 15

August 17

August 19

Pool B

August 15

August 17

August 19

Pool C

August 15

August 17

August 19

Pool D

August 14

August 16

August 18

Pool E

August 14

August 16

August 18

Pool F
The Greek pair of Pavlos Beligratis and Athanasios Michalopoulos had to withdraw from their final group game after Beligratis incurred an injury, this gave their opponents Mariano Baracetti and Martín Conde a 21–0, 21–0 straight sets victory.

August 14

August 16

August 18

Playoffs

Round of 16
20 August

21 August

Quarter-finals
August 22

Semi-finals
August 23

Bronze-medal match
August 25

This was Switzerland's first medal in beach volleyball.

Gold-medal match
August 25

This was Brazil's first gold medal in men's beach volleyball.

Final ranking

References

External links
Results of the Olympic Tournament

See also
Volleyball at the Summer Olympics

O
Men's Beach Volleyball
2004
Men's events at the 2004 Summer Olympics